David Ogrin (born December 31, 1957) is an American professional golfer.

Ogrin was born and grew up in Waukegan, Illinois. He graduated from Waukegan East High School in 1976, then attended Texas A&M University, graduating in 1980 with a degree in economics. In 1980, he won the Illinois Open and the Illinois State Amateur tournament, something not done again until 2017. He turned professional in 1980.

Ogrin played on the PGA Tour from 1983 to 1999. In over 500 starts, he had 32 top-10 finishes including a win at the 1996 LaCantera Texas Open. He also played on the Nationwide Tour where his best finish was a T-3 at the 1993 NIKE Connecticut Open

Ogrin joined the Champions Tour in 2008. His best finish is a T-24 at the 2009 Dick's Sporting Goods Open.

Ogrin is a big fan of the Chicago Cubs; his son Clark Addison Ogrin was named after two streets near the Cubs' baseball stadium. 

Ogrin and Tim Nugent, a golf course architect, designed High Meadow Ranch Golf Club, an 18-hole public course in Magnolia, Texas, that features three six-hole loops.

Professional wins (6)

PGA Tour wins (1)

PGA Tour playoff record (0–2)

Other wins (5)
1980 Illinois Open Championship (as an amateur)
1987 Deposit Guaranty Golf Classic
1988 Peru Open
1989 Chrysler Team Championship (with Ted Schulz)
1994 Peru Open

Results in major championships

Note: Ogrin never played in The Open Championship.

CUT = missed the half-way cut
"T" = tied

Summary

Most consecutive cuts made – 4 (1985 PGA – 1989 U.S. Open)
Longest streak of top-10s – 1

See also
1982 PGA Tour Qualifying School graduates
1991 PGA Tour Qualifying School graduates
1992 PGA Tour Qualifying School graduates

References

External links

American male golfers
Texas A&M Aggies men's golfers
PGA Tour golfers
PGA Tour Champions golfers
Golfers from Illinois
Golfers from Texas
Sportspeople from Waukegan, Illinois
People from Comal County, Texas
1957 births
Living people